Eupithecia pactia is a moth in the family Geometridae first described by Herbert Druce in 1893. It is found in Mexico.

References

Moths described in 1893
pactia
Moths of Central America